The Jamestown Civic Center is a 6,500-seat multi-purpose arena in Jamestown, North Dakota. It was built in 1973 and has capacity to fit 6500 people. It is the former home to the University of Jamestown Jimmies basketball teams.

KISS performed at the arena during their Asylum Tour on March 14, 1986.

References

Indoor arenas in North Dakota
Sports venues in North Dakota
Basketball venues in North Dakota
Buildings and structures in Jamestown, North Dakota
1973 establishments in North Dakota
Sports venues completed in 1973
Defunct college basketball venues in the United States